Margaret River Pro is an event on the ASP World Surfing Tour currently WSL World Surfing League.

It was established in 1985. It has had a range of sponsors over time, including various agencies of the Western Australian government.
The event has been held every year since at Margaret River in Western Australia, except in 2018 when the third and subsequent rounds for men and fourth and subsequent rounds for women were held in Uluwatu, Indonesia because of shark attacks.

Results

See also
 Surfing locations in South West Western Australia

References

External links
 
 

 
Surfing competitions in Australia
World Surf League
Margaret River, Western Australia
Recurring sporting events established in 1985
1985 establishments in Australia
Sports competitions in Western Australia